Vincenzo Maranghi (born in Florence on August 3, 1937) was an Italian magnate, private banker and the CEO of Mediobanca.

Early life 
Maranghi graduated high school from The Institute of the Piarist Fathers in Florence, later enrolling in the Faculty of Law at his local university. Maranghi moved to Milan, where he enrolled at the Catholic University of The Sacred Heart and continued to study Law while also working part-time as a journalist at the prestigious Il Sole newspaper.

When Maranghi graduated Law school, he designed the financial magazine "Quattrosoldi", aimed at providing economic advice for the average Italian, he founded the publication alongside Italian media executive and print-media magnate Gianni Mazzocchi. Early in his career as a journalist, Maranghi married Anna Castellini Baldissera, a member of the influential Italian Castellini Baldissera family, who had made a fortune in banking and textiles. After his brief profession as a journalist, Maranghi was placed in charge of restructuring and managing the "Centre for Economic Studies of Alta Italia"; around this time he also worked in the offices of Remo Malinverni, the General Director of the ORGA business consultancy institute, a well regarded Italian financial think-tank.

Mediobanca 
Maranghi's career in finance began when he was offered a job at Mediobanca where he worked for Enrico Cuccia, largely considered to be one of the most influential financiers in world at the time. Cuccia attained his power through his dealings with Fiat and a plethora of Italy's largest businesses. Throughout his time at Mediobanca Maranghi was generally seen as Cuccia's most direct confidant. Maranghi was quickly promoted to central co-director of the bank in 1975, eventually becoming the central director for all of Mediobanca's operations two years later, a role which undertook all practical oversight and management of the firm.

In 1982, after Enrico Cuccia's resignation, Maranghi was appointed Director of the Board alongside.

Maranghi later took over Silvio Salteri's role as general manager and managing director, ensuring his place as the heir or "Dauphin" of Mediobanca. During his years of directing the bank, Vincenzo Maranghi began a number of initiatives to secure its independence and assure its upward mobility. Maranghi is largely accredited with being responsible for much of the growth and development that Mediobanca's business consultancy arm, capital markets and investment portfolios experienced in recent years; his development of financial strategies and infrastructure within the company created revenues which provided the company with billions of US dollars.

as CEO 
When Cuccia died on June 23, 2000, Maranghi took his place as CEO. Maranghi's succession had been a long accepted fact, he was often referred to in the Italian media as "Cuccia's Dauphin" or prince. Maranghi's succession was further secured by the expulsion of younger bankers such as Gerardo Braggiotti and Matteo Arpe who had conspired to take the position for themselves. Maranghi held his office until April 13, 2003, when he resigned, following a long financial battle because a "conspiracy erupted inside the board of directors"  which led to a new syndicate agreement and bank governance structures.

When resigning Maranghi made sure that Mediobanca maintained independence by renouncing any personal benefits that were not already foreseen by his ordinary employment contract, this allowed him to leave the bank in the hands of his two closest confidants, Alberto Nagel and Renato Pagliaro.

Death 
Vincenzo Maranghi died of a terminal illness in Milan on July 17, 2007.

References 

Italian bankers
Italian politicians
Italian chief executives
1937 births
2007 deaths